Snöveltorp is a locality situated in Söderköping Municipality, Östergötland County, Sweden with 333 inhabitants in 2010.

References 

Populated places in Östergötland County
Populated places in Söderköping Municipality